Svatopluk Svoboda (5 December 1886 – 19 October 1971) was a Czech gymnast who competed for Czechoslovakia in the 1920 Summer Olympics. He was born in Prague and died in Brno. In 1920 he was a member of the Czechoslovak gymnastic team which finished fourth in the team event.

References

1886 births
1971 deaths
Czech male artistic gymnasts
Czechoslovak male artistic gymnasts
Olympic gymnasts of Czechoslovakia
Gymnasts at the 1920 Summer Olympics
Gymnasts from Prague